The Book and the Sword is a 2008 Chinese television series adapted from Louis Cha's novel of the same title. The series was first broadcast on CETV-3 in China in 2009. It starred Qiao Zhenyu, Adam Cheng, Niki Chow, and Liu Dekai.

Plot

Although the flow of events is generally similar to that in the novel, Yu Wanting's role is greatly emphasised, with him being the primary antagonist instead of the Qianlong Emperor. "Yu Wanting" is actually the alter ego of the exiled prince Yintang, a younger half-brother of the Yongzheng Emperor. The power-hungry Yintang seeks vengeance and wants to usurp his nephew (the Qianlong Emperor)'s throne. Yintang knows the truth that the Qianlong Emperor is not the legitimate successor to the throne and he constantly threatens the emperor with the evidence he holds. Yintang rallies a group of martial artists in the jianghu and establishes the Red Flower Society. He instigates the society's members and some tribal peoples in northwestern China to rebel against the Qing government.

Yintang fakes his death at one point and allows his godson, Chen Jialuo, to succeed him as leader of the Red Flower Society. However, within the society, the Chang brothers, Wei Chunhua and Shi Shuangying are the only ones who know that "Yu Wanting" is still alive, and they serve as his spies by watching over Chen and the others. The series also feature a different ending from the novel, with many of the society's members meeting their ends at the hands of Yintang. The surviving ones, under Chen Jialuo's leadership, confront Yintang to put an end to his ruthless ambitions.

Cast

 Qiao Zhenyu as Chen Jialuo / Fuk'anggan
 Adam Cheng as Qianlong Emperor
 Niki Chow as Huoqingtong
 Liu Ying as Princess Fragrance
 Liu Dekai as Yu Wanting / Yintang
 Lu Chen as Li Yuanzhi
 Li Chengyuan as Zhou Qi
 Fu Hongjun as Taoist Wuchen
 Zhang Ping as Zhao Banshan
 Liu Naiyi as Wen Tailai
 Zhong Liang as Chang Bozhi
 Tan Jianchang as Chang Hezhi
 Li Yuan as Xu Tianhong
 Xu Xiaoming as Yang Chengxie
 Ng Yuen-chun as Wei Chunhua
 Lu Yuwen as Zhang Jin
 Qi Fang as Luo Bing
 Zhao Dongbo as Shi Shuangying
 Zhang Kai as Jiang Sigen
 Deep Ng as Yu Yutong
 Sally Chen as Empress Dowager Chongqing
 Bryan Leung as Yuan Shixiao
 Wong Yat-fei as Cheng Zhengde
 Yuen Qiu as Guan Mingmei
 Li Donglin as Zhang Zhaozhong
 You Jiahui as Bu Qianjia
 Li Shipeng as Tong Zhaohe
 Wang Gang as Zhou Zhongying
 Tong Xiaomei as Zhou Qi's mother
 Zheng Wei as Zhou Yingjie
 Cui Gui as Ma Zhen
 Dong Zhihua as Lu Feiqing
 Yao Jia as Empress
 Ren Wei as Heshen
 Yang Yifan as Bai Zhen
 Chen Tao as Etu
 Hong Zongyi as Prince Zheng
 Zhang Wei as Hong Shi
 Shen Baoping as Yongzheng Emperor
 Zhao Enhan as Nine Gates Commander
 Wang Yingqi as Zhaohui
 Gong Fangmin as Li Kexiu
 An Ruiyun as E'ertai
 Du Yachun as Xu Xiangping
 Wu Lihua as Physician Cao
 Yang Min as Yuruyi
 Liu Hengyu as Aizhuo'er
 Zhou Jiwei as Long Jun
 Yan Jun as Tang Yilei
 Jin Peng as Hahetai
 Liu Zifei as Yuezhi princess
 Hou Jianglong as Han Wenchong
 Xu Xiangdong as Muzhuolun
 Luo Ya as Xiaolan, Xiaolu, Wu Chanjuan
 Huang Wei as Rui Dalin
 Niu Ziqing as Meng Jianxiong
 Liu Juntao as Yan Shizhang
 Zhang Shaohui as Cheng Huang
 Jiao Changdao as Zeng Tu'an
 Yuan Ming as Wan Qinglan
 Gan Qilin as Li Guangping
 Wang Hong as Eunuch Li
 Song Haitao as Yan Bogan
 Zhang Guofeng as Ma Shanjun
 Wang Xinchen as Gu Youlan

Reception
The series has been criticised on Guangzhou Daily by viewers, who feel that the story deviates the most from the original source among all the film and television adaptations of Louis Cha's works.

References

External links
  The Book and the Sword on Sina.com

Chinese wuxia television series
Television series set in the Qing dynasty
Works based on The Book and the Sword
2009 Chinese television series debuts
2009 Chinese television series endings
Television shows about rebels
Television shows based on works by Jin Yong
Qianlong Emperor